Metro Station has released 2 studio albums, 5 extended plays, 17 singles and 13 music videos. The band members consist of Trace Cyrus and Mason Musso. Their hit single, "Shake It" went double platinum in the US and reached number 10 on the Billboard Hot 100. "Seventeen Forever" peaked at number 42 on the Billboard Hot 100 and is certified gold in the US. Their self-titled debut album is certified gold in Canada and reached number 39 on the Billboard 200. Their second album, Savior was released in 2015.

Albums

Studio albums

Extended plays

Singles

Lead singles

Promotional singles

Music videos

Notes

References

Discographies of American artists